Clay Township, Missouri may refer to one of the following places in the State of Missouri:

 Clay Township, Adair County, Missouri
 Clay Township, Andrew County, Missouri
 Clay Township, Atchison County, Missouri
 Clay Township, Clark County, Missouri
 Clay Township, Douglas County, Missouri
 Clay Township, Dunklin County, Missouri
 Clay Township, Gasconade County, Missouri
 Clay Township, Greene County, Missouri
 Clay Township, Harrison County, Missouri
 Clay Township, Holt County, Missouri
 Clay Township, Lafayette County, Missouri
 Clay Township, Linn County, Missouri
 Clay Township, Monroe County, Missouri
 Clay Township, Ralls County, Missouri
 Clay Township, Saline County, Missouri
 Clay Township, Shelby County, Missouri
 Clay Township, Sullivan County, Missouri

See also
Clay Township (disambiguation)

Missouri township disambiguation pages